In computing, ROM Mark or BD-ROM Mark is a serialization technology designed to guard against mass production piracy or the mass duplication and sale of unauthorized copies of pre-recorded Blu-ray Discs. Only licensed BD-ROM manufacturers have access to the equipment that can make these unique ROM Marks, thus allowing authentic BD-ROM media like movies and music to be identified.

The ROM Mark contains the Volume ID required to decrypt content encrypted using AACS.

See also 
 Burst Cutting Area

Notes

References 
 Panasonic, Philips, Sony. 3C BD-ROM Mark Specification.
 Edmonds, Robert A.; (Saratoga, CA) ; McDonnell, Kevin J.; (Pleasanton, CA) ; Meulder, Johan De; (Kessel, BE). "Method and apparatus for identifying a digital recording source".
 MPAA. "Digital Content Protection Status Report". IRMA Annual Recording Media Forum. (PowerPoint file, via The Internet Archive)
 CDRInfo. "Blu-ray Disc Marking System Explained".
 CDRInfo. "DaTARIUS DaTABANK Reads BD-ROM Mark".

Blu-ray Disc
Optical disc authoring
Compact Disc and DVD copy protection